Radical trust is the confidence that any structured organization, such as a government, library, business, religion, or museum, has in collaboration and empowerment within online communities. Specifically, it pertains to the use of blogs, wiki and online social networking platforms by organizations to cultivate relationships with an online community that then can provide feedback and direction for the organization's interest. The organization 'trusts' and uses that input in its management.

One of the first appearances of the notion of radical trust appears in an info graphic outlining the base principles of web 2.0 in Tim O'Reilly's weblog post "What is Web 2.0" . Radical Trust is listed as the guiding example of trusting the validity of consumer generated media.

This concept is considered to be an underlying assumption of Library 2.0. The adoption of radical trust by a library would require its management let go of some of its control over the library and building an organization without an end result in mind. (Harris, 2006). The direction a library would take would be based on input provided by people through online communities. These changes in the organization may merely be anecdotal in nature, making this method of organization management dramatically distinct from data-based or evidence based management.

In marketing, Collin Douma further describes the notion of radical trust in the article "Radical Trust"  August 28, 2006 Marketing Magazine (Canada) as a key mindset required for marketers and advertisers to enter the social media marketing space. Conventional marketing dictates and maintains control of messages to cause the greatest persuasion in consumer decisions. Given the proliferation of peer-to-peer consumer reviews and other social media platforms that enable consumer generated media, marketing agencies can no longer control the skew of that information. Marketers who are creating and participating in online platforms to facilitate conversation are radically trusting the consumer to build the brand based on the experience that is most relevant to them.

References 

O'Reilly, Tim. What is Web 2.0 . Design Patterns and Business Models for the Next Generation of Software, Sept 30, 2005. Wikipedia listed as primary example of radical trust.
Douma, Collin. Radical Trust. Marketing Magazine . August 28. 2006
Douma, Collin. What is Radical Trust?  Oct 1, 2006
 Chan, Sebastian and Jim Spadaccini. Radical Trust: The State of the Museum Blogosphere 
 Fichter, Darlene. Web 2.0, Library 2.0 and Radical Trust: A First Take. April 2, 2006.
Harris, Christopher. A Matter of (Radical) Trust. School Library Journal. New York: Nov 2006. Vol. 52, (11) pg. 24.
Kimberly Bolan, Meg Canada, Rob Cullin. Web, Library, and Teen Services 2.0. Young Adult Library Services. Chicago: Winter 2007. Vol. 5, Iss. 2; pg. 40-43.

Social media
Social networks
Web 2.0
Library 2.0